"All That I Am" is a song first recorded by Elvis Presley as part of his 1966 album Spinout. It was released in 1966 on a single with  "Spinout", the title song from the same movie, on the opposite side. Both sides charted on the Billboard Hot 100: "Spinout" peaked at number 40 and then "All That I Am" at number 41. "All What I Am" also charted on the Billboard Easy Listening chart, spending there 16 weeks in total and peaking at number 9 on the week of November 19, 1966. The single "All That I Am" spent eight weeks on the UK Singles Chart, peaking at number 18 on the week of October 16, 1966.

Charts

References

External links 
 Elvis* - Spinout / All That I Am at Discogs
 U.S. release at Discogs

1966 songs
1966 singles
Elvis Presley songs
RCA Records singles
Songs written by Sid Tepper
Songs written by Roy C. Bennett